Pearl Steam Laundry, also known as Pearl Laundry, is a historic laundry building located in downtown Evansville, Indiana. It was built in 1912.  It is a one-story, brick building.

It was listed on the National Register of Historic Places in 1984.

References

Industrial buildings and structures on the National Register of Historic Places in Indiana
Industrial buildings completed in 1912
Buildings and structures in Evansville, Indiana
National Register of Historic Places in Evansville, Indiana